Brent Wilson may refer to:
 Brent Wilson (rugby union)
 Brent Wilson (filmmaker)
 Brent Wilson (musician)